The 1980 Elon Fightin' Christians football team was an American football team that represented Elon University of Elon, North Carolina, as a member of the South Atlantic Conference (SAC) during the 1980 NAIA Division I football season. In their fourth year under head coach Jerry Tolley, the Christians compiled a 13–1 record (6–1 against SAC opponents) and tied for the SAC championship.

Running back Bobby Hedrick rushed for 1,394 yards in the regular season – 1,793 yards with three post-season games included. He set Elon's all-time rushing record with 5,603 rushing yards in four years. He was also a first-team pick on the 1980 Little All-America college football team. 

Tight end Joey Hackett went on to play in the NFL. John Bangley was the quarterback.

Schedule

References

External links
 Elon University film on the 1980-81 seasons

Elon
Elon Phoenix football seasons
NAIA Football National Champions
Elon Fightin' Christians football